The Featherz (formerly The Feathers) are a Welsh and English band with glam and punk influences (self-styled as "Flock Rock") led by Danie Centric (known as Danie Cox prior to January 2018, born 15 December 1990 in Bridgend) on lead vocals and guitar.  Centric formed the band with two fellow former members of Poussez Posse (aka Georgie Girl And Her Poussez Posse), a band fronted by Georgina Baillie and mentored by Adam Ant. After leaving Baillie and Ant to form their own group, they received press coverage in the Ipswich Star, Wales On Sunday, Basingstoke Gazette, website Louder Than War and rock magazine Vive Le Rock who included their track RNR★ on the free CD with the January/February 2014 edition (issue 16).  They also completed a UK national tour supporting Boy George, in three of whose videos Centric appeared and subsequently toured with The Damned.

Since May 2014, Centric/Cox is the last remaining founder member. Currently the only other permanent member is longtime drummer Dazzle Monroe (formerly of Extreme Noise Terror, born Darren Olley, 7 February 1966 in Ipswich). Together, Centric and Monroe have continued to record and play live under the Featherz bandname either as a duo or else with guest lead guitarists/bassists.  Since early 2019 the band has been mostly on hold while Centric focuses on her side project, all-female Slade tribute band Slady (styled SLADY).

History

2011–2014 - Formation
Centric, then known as Cox, arrived in London in October 2010 to pursue a career as a professional musician. In January 2011, she was recruited to Georgie Girl And Her Poussez Posse as guitarist and backing vocalist. The band also included Baillie,  Molly Spiers-MacLeod (the daughter of Spizz) on bass and backing vocals, drummer Rachael Smith and additional guitarist Fiona Bevan. This lineup supported Ant on several tour dates in early 2011 and recorded tracks for a planned single plus EP.  Footage from early 2011 of a Poussez Posse band meeting at Ant's home is included in The Blueblack Hussar, a documentary about Ant directed by Jack Bond. Unhappy with the general direction of the band and Ant's style of mentoring, Cox, Spiers-MacLeod and Smith all left the group (to be replaced by a new lineup, still fronted by Baillie and including future Curse of Lono bassist Charis Anderson, which continued to support Ant on tour until the end of 2012.)  The trio formed their own band The Feathers, making their debut guerilla gig appearance at the Occupy London camp outside St Paul's Cathedral on 23 October 2011.

The band's track "Life Stranger" reached the quarter finals of the YouBloom online talent contest and was released on the compilation Hipsters 3.  Cox and Spiers-MacLeod also performed an acoustic set on Garry Bushell's Rancid Sounds radio show on TotalRock in April 2012. Two years later in April 2014, they performed a second acoustic set for Bushell's show - by now transferred to online literary community Litopia's podcast section. At around the time of the first session, Smith left the group to be replaced by Alex Gold, also of The Boys.  Gold in turn would be replaced by Monroe in January 2013.

In April 2013, Cox befriended Boy George after they met at the launch party of an exhibition of stage costumes of their mutual hero David Bowie at the Victoria and Albert Museum at which George was a guest speaker. Impressed with the appearance and demeanour of the glammed-up Cox, George invited her to show herself on stage. Subsequently, Cox appeared in three videos for singles by George: "I'm Coming Home" (also featuring a cameo by Monroe), "King of Everything" and "My God" directed by Dean Stockings. The band also supported George on his November 2013 solo UK tour to promote his album This Is What I Do.

In early 2013, the band undertook a photo session for fashion designer Mark Charles and his Charles of London fashion label. From then until mid 2016, all band members regularly wore Charles' designs as stagewear (as Cox did frequently for some time thereafter, resuming the practice with her Slady bandmates in 2019.) Charles also released the band's debut single "RNR★" on his Charles Of London Records label.  The A-side was later included on the compilation CD Teenage Rampage, cover-mounted on issue 16 of Vive Le Rock magazine.  The magazine's track guide described Cox as a "rising star" and the band as "injected with glam rock attitude" which "will give you glitter-covered goose bumps and get your feet stomping."  The single also received airplay on BBC Radio Wales and Radio Caroline.

The Ipswich Star gave a headline preview to the band's 25 January 2014 gig at the Steamboat Tavern in Monroe's native Ipswich, alongside a photo of the band, noting how "The London trio, fresh from  Boy George on his recent UK tour, led by Danie Cox, are getting rave reviews for their brand of punk-pop." Wales On Sunday extensively interviewed Cox in the 9 February 2014 edition about the band, their associations with Ant, Baillie, George and Charles, and her life in general. Commenting on Cox and her band, the newspaper noted "With her electrifying red hair, extravagant make-up and outrageous dress sense, 23-year-old Danie Cox and her band The Featherz look every inch pop stars."

2014–2016 - Alice Atkinson era
Spiers-MacLeod left the band in May 2014 and Alice Atkinson was announced as replacement bass player in early June.  She made her debut on 28 June 2014 at the 100 Club alongside new additional guitarist Lily Marlene  (the daughter of Bond's partner and credited on The Blueblack Hussar as Assistant to the Director). The gig also marked Cox's return to the stage following a severe knee injury days after Spiers McLeod's departure. Due to Marlene's commitments outside the band, she left amicably and an ongoing vacancy for additional guitarist existed for 14 months until Daniel Jones' spell with the band.

In the meantime Cox, Atkinson and Monroe continued to gig in the three-piece format, occasionally joined by various guest guitarists, including David Donley, his student Zoe Keeling, Vera Wild of the band Jelly and Polly Hedges of the band Seek Destroy. In late 2014, they recorded fresh material at Broadoak Studios, Sussex with producer/guitarist Kevin Armstrong.  Their 14 February 2015 headline gig at the Irish Centre in Basingstoke received praise from the Basingstoke Gazette "The headline band were The Featherz ... who continued the general theme of girls showing just how well they can rock it up ... Not quite as heavy as (second on the bill act) Petrol Girls, they still had a real fast punky set. They had also picked up a posse of new followers who were now ready to worship every bead and every bit of glitter - as well as dance along to their songs."

The band also played the Pavilion Stage of the 2015 Rebellion Festival. Their set received an enthusiastic review from Martin Haslam of Louder Than War: "Bringing their brand of self-styled ‘Flock Rock’ to the masses, I'm pleased that the venue is filling up. Glam anthems (Glamthems?) get the crowd onside, ‘When Was The Last Time You Had Sex?’ and other ear worms. I’ve seen them before, but this line up has added Alice Atkinson, which is a very good thing; the three-piece with Danie Cox and Dazzle Monroe are now tighter and born to entertain. Championed by Boy George and dressed by Charles Of London, they deserve your attention. Now!" The band appeared again at the 2017 and 2018 festivals, both times on the Opera House stage. Cox is scheduled to return to the festival in 2023 on the Empress Ballroom stage with Slady.

A second single for Charles Of London Records, "You" was released from the sessions with Armstrong on download in early September 2015 followed by a CD release two months later.  A video was filmed back in April 2015 in Brighton, directed by Stockings. Interviewed by Haslam at Rebellion for Louder Than War, Cox announced that the band's next release would be their debut album.  Cox also commented on her philosophy as a performer and bandleader: "I'd always had a dream, to write my own songs, to express myself through my clothes and how I present myself. Luckily, I found that in The Featherz, in London ... We are The Featherz, there is nothing else for me. I'd rather die than give up. Our songs are statements. It really is all I can do"

Around the time of the single's download release, the additional guitarist role was briefly filled when Jones joined. He left amicably three months later due to musical differences, shortly before the band played three high profile support slots in Sheffield, Liverpool and London, for The Damned.  Following the death of her hero David Bowie in January 2016, Cox was filmed by Italian television show Studio Aperto performing Bowie's songs at his shrine at the Heddon Street telephone box while the Featherz performed at a Bowie memorial concert at the Union Chapel, Islington with Mick Ronson's sister Maggi guesting with the band on vocals for "Ziggy Stardust" Cox and Mike Garson's biographer Clifford Slapper also performed a vocal/piano version of "We Are the Dead".

Also in early 2016 the band, plus Donley again on additional guitar, recorded new material at Quadra Studios in Walthamstow with producer John "Lucifer" Pridige.  A new additional guitarist, Chris Shepherd, joined the band in April.  In June a video, featuring the new lineup, was filmed in Southend for Atkinson composition Forget All You Know. In early September, the video was posted to YouTube and this track and a cover of Moonage Daydream (featuring Slapper on piano), both from the Quadra session, were uploaded to the group's Bandcamp account and iTunes store.  Prior to this, a trailer video featuring a clip from a third track from Quadra, a cover of "The Ballroom Blitz" had been posted to YouTube.  Cox and Slapper recorded another version of Moonage Daydream for the latter's planned album Bowiesongs 2, while Cox also collaborated with The Lurkers on their track High Velocity, which was released as a single 24 November 2017.  Louder Than War's Ged Babey praised Cox's contribution: "Dani (sic) has a likeable Honey Bane meets Beki Bondage singing style and is perfect on the song." The track received airplay on Steve Lamacq's show on BBC Radio 6music and Cox recorded further material with the Lurkers in December 2017, February 2018 and May 2018.

2016–2018 - Five-Year-Itch, Ordinary Girl? EP
Atkinson and Shepherd left the band in late 2016.  Guitarist Holly Henderson of the band Dorja and bassist Jenny Lane of the band Planet Of The Capes, both of whom previously deputised in these roles in The Featherz, served as temporary live members until the arrival of permanent replacements, Swedish bassist Gerda Lucy Rankka aka Lucy Lawbreaker and Italian additional guitarist Aryanne Maudit.  In the meantime, the band produced new music videos of the tracks Chelsea, Takes One To Know One and Moonage Daydream and recorded further material in Quadra Studios with Pridige and Faebhean Kwest.

Appearing on internet radio station K2K Radio's show Flipside London Radio hosted by Aidan McManus, on 28 March 2017, Cox confirmed that the band's imminent debut album was entitled Five-Year-Itch and would be 17 tracks long.  The album was released on 13 April 2017 and was compiled by Pridige (who also funded the release) from content from various sessions since 2012 (hence the album title) including material from his own sessions with the band at Quadra Studios as well as the Broadoak Studios sessions with Armstrong, both sides of the RNR★ single recorded in 2013 and the band's earliest attempt at making an album at Perry Vale Studios in 2012, as well as Pridige's own live recordings of the band. Vive Le Rock's Alison Bateman rated the album 7/10.  Although lukewarm about the choices of covers included, she nevertheless enthused, "(The band) have already built a buzz with their energetic live shows, centred on flame-haired attitude-oozing young frontwoman Danie Cox.  Their cheeky punked-up glitter rock risks being a tough act to translate to the studio, but Five-Year-Itch mostly manages with charismatic flair... They're neither short on musical chops, nor shy of buckling down to serious business of writing infuriatingly immovable hooks."

The band's next single, Ordinary Girl? recorded late 2016 at Quadra with Atkinson and Shepherd (shortly before their departures) and produced by Pridige, was released on Bandcamp on 1 May 2017.  The single cover featured Cox's friend, the late Imogen Goldie whose mother Diane had previously designed and provided the costumes worn by the band in the Forget All You Know video and again in the video for this single, in which she herself appeared. In September, the band announced their intention to recruit a keyboard player. Successful applicant Catherine Robertson from Wales made her debut with the band on 26 October at the O2 Islington when they supported Penetration (whose song Don't Dictate previously appeared on Five-Year-Itch.) In late November Maudit left and was replaced by Lawbreaker's partner and fellow Swede John Jönsson, who had already substituted for Maudit at two of the four dates of the band's November 2017 UK tour.

The CD edition of Ordinary Girl? was released on 3 January 2018, also including the last remaining tracks from the first Quadra studios session from early 2016. Ged Babey, reviewing the EP for Louder Than War, was suitably impressed, describing the band as "brash, flash, glam, blam-blam wiggy, Ziggy, rockin rollin’, into Bolan…  just a great old-skool party band," the lead track as having "the feel of a fab 1979 Noo Wave single -sprinkled with glitter and all over Radio Wun - not arf!" with "that staccato Lene Lovich feel that Hazel O'Connor nicked and lovely thick slices of guitar,"  the video as "beautifully lo-fi and am-dram and captures a band who take their music but not themselves too seriously," and the cover image of Imogen Goldie cover as "proving if nothing else that behind the glitter there are some tears and there is more ‘depth’ to the band than there might initially seem."

The band recorded a session in January 2018 with Centric (as Cox was now known) self-producing. Around this time it was announced that Centric was now permanent vocalist for The Lurkers, while also continuing with The Featherz. In February 2018 Maudit returned to the band after only three months away, to form a new six piece lineup, with Centric no longer playing guitar.  Further work on the January recording was carried out in mid March; shortly afterwards however, Maudit, Lawbreaker, Jönsson and Robertson all left.  In April, with Pridige once again producing, Centric and Monroe recorded another session, with lead guitarist Calle Englemarc of The Members and, together with Lane on bass, they filmed an official live video at the Dublin Castle Bassist Emily Condon (of Southend band The Fleas) joined the band in July, making her debut in August at the Rebellion Festival, but was fired in September after pulling out of several gigs, the last of which, in Ipswich, went ahead regardless as a duo performance, which has since remained the band format.  Centric, Monroe and Pridige also recorded yet further tracks at QRS Studios at the end of 2018.

2019 onwards - Side projects, second album
Centric's second single with The Lurkers, Electrical Guitar, came out in January 2019 and topped the UK Vinyl Singles chart.  Parent album Sex Crazy was released in October 2020 featuring the two A-sides recorded with Centric  (although "This Is Your Revolution" and other songs were rerecorded in 2019 without Centric for the release.) Interviewed for Vive Le Rock in 2020 to promote the album release, Centric's fellow Lurkers praised her contributions.  Esso recalled "I asked her to join us for a few tracks or whatever, and I'm glad she did. I think she sounds great, it gave us a bit of a lift - she's a great singer."  Moore concurred, "We were looking for a fresh feel at the time, so when she asked to meet Esso to talk about his book God's Lonely Men I suggested she ask her if she like [sic] to do some vocals, she agreed and made a great job of "High Velocity" and "Electrical Guitar." I can't imagine anyone else singing "High Velocity."

Early in 2019, Pridige mastered the Featherz' 2017-2018 Quadra Studios sessions to form a second album with the working title Flock On, however this was not released at the time as Centric was dissatisfied with the mix on one track.  The combination of intensive Slady-related activity (as detailed below) and disruption from the COVID-19 pandemic has left this project on hiatus up to the present.  However, both Centric and Pridige have expressed willingness to complete the album at some point in the future.

Centric also formed all-female Slade tribute band Slady, with drummer Fiona Dulake and bassist Wendy Solomon (aka Angel Melodyhorn - the partner of David Woodcock who has guested with the band), who made their debut in Southend in November 2018. They were later joined by guitarist Annie Needham and drummer Sophie Reed who replaced Dulake.  Respectively, Centric, Solomon, Reed and Needham adopted the aliases Gobby Holder, Jem Lea. Donna Powell and Davina Hill in the band. Since February 2019, this project has been Centric's main focus and they played at Slade's main fan convention in Wolverhampton in Octobers of 2019, 2021 and 2022. They were listed in Metro as one of three "Acts To Catch This Christmas" in their 'Going Out' section.  

Slady's live set for 2021 featured a track-by-track performance of the hit album Slade Alive!.  Needham left Slady at the end of 2021, once all existing commitments were completed, to focus on her other band Sweet Giant (formerly Big Peyote) who were relocating to the United States. The search for Needham's replacement received press coverage in the Shropshire Star.  She was replaced by Dawn Firth-Godbehere as the new "Davina Hill" in early 2022. Shortly afterwards, Jessica Dann replaced Reed as "Donna Powell" on drums.  The band toured with The Rezillos in June and recorded a studio session in August 2022 for a first single, a cover of Slade's "Merry Xmas Everybody" and custom composition "Slade Are For Life Not Just For Xmas" (by Slade fan John Barker).  A video for the former was filmed in a Hoxton pub in October; the filming attracted coverage from the Hackney Post and Hackney Gazette. The CD and download single were released and the video was premiered on Youtube on 1 December followed by a video for the second track on 14 January 2023.

Monroe meanwhile also contributes to Slady as official concert photographer and graphic designer and on one occasion (an August 2019 support slot for John Rossall's Glitter Band at the Dublin Castle) as substitute drummer for Reed, once again on stage with Centric. In addition, he occasionally plays reunion gigs with his early Suffolk scene band, Rue De La Mort.

Personnel

The Featherz
Current members
 Danie Centric (formerly Cox) – vocals September 2011 – present, guitar September 2011 – February 2018 and April 2018 – present
 Dazzle Monroe – drums January 2013 – present
(Band dormant since early 2019)

Former members
Molly Spiers-MacLeod – bass September 2011 – May 2014
Rachael Smith – drums September 2011 – April 2012
Alex Gold – drums May 2012 – December 2012
Lily Marlene – lead guitar April 2014 – August 2014
Alice Atkinson – bass June 2014 – December 2016
Daniel Jones – lead guitar October 2015 – November 2015
Chris Shepherd – lead guitar April 2016 – December 2016
Aryanne Maudit – lead guitar February 2017 – November 2017 and February 2018 – March 2018
Lucy Lawbreaker – bass February 2017 – March 2018
Catherine Robertson – keyboards, October 2017 – March 2018
John Jönsson – lead guitar December 2017 – January 2018, rhythm guitar February 2018 – March 2018 
Emily Condon – bass July 2018 – September 2018

Timeline

Slady
Current members
 Danie Centric (formerly Cox) – vocals and guitar as "Gobby Holder" November 2018 – present
 Wendy Solomon – bass as "Jem Lea" November 2018 - present
 Jessica Dann - drums as "Donna Powell" February 2022 - present
 Dawn Firth-Godbehere - lead guitar as "Davina Hill" February 2022 - present

Former members
 Fiona Dulake – drums as "Donna Powell" November 2018 – April 2019
 Sophie Read - drums as "Donna Powell" May 2019 - January 2022
 Annie Needham - lead guitar as "Davina Hill" May 2019 - December 2021

Timeline

Discography

The discography of The Featherz consists of one studio album (including some live material), one EP, four singles including the EP title track, nine music videos and one original appearance on another release.

A second studio album, recorded 2017-2018, remains unreleased.

Centric has also sung on two singles by The Lurkers and played guitar and sung on a single by Slady.

Album
Five-Year-Itch (Flockrock Records, FRO1, 2017 - CD album only)

 "Takes 1 2 Know 1" 
 "When I Fall In Love" 
 "RNR★"
 "When Was The Last Time You Had Sex?"
 "Dig Me"
 "Chelsea"
 "Bad Girl"
 "Party Crasher"
 "Forget All You Know"
 "Moonage Daydream"
 "Patience" (Live - Acoustic) 
 "Ballroom Blitz"
 "Give Over Darling"
 "Cum On Feel The Noize"
 "Beat On The Brap" (Live)
 "Hopeless Summer" (Live)
 "Don't Dictate" (Live)

Singles/EP
 RNR★ (Charles Of London Records, COLRecords1, 2013, 7" vinyl only)
 "RNR★"
 "When Was The Last Time You Had Sex?"

 You (Charles Of London Records, COLR002, 2015, mp3s on Bandcamp plus CD single)
 "You"
 "Bad Girl"

 Forget All You Know (2016, mp3s on Bandcamp and iTunes. A CD single edition was planned, but did not materialize - instead the tracks were included on the Five-Year-Itch album.)
 "Forget All You Know"
 "Moonage Daydream"

 Ordinary Girl? EP (Flockrock Records, FRO2, 2017, Track 1 only mp3 single on Bandcamp and iTunes. 2018 CD EP of full release)

 "Ordinary Girl?"
 "Do You Wanna Feel Free?"
 "20th Century Boy"
 "When Was The Last Time You Had Sex?" (Live)
 "Ordinary Girl?" (original mix)
 "Bad Girl" (Live - Acoustic - bonus hidden track)

Compilations
 Hipsters 3 (Acid Jazz Records, AJX287, 2012, CD)
 "Life Stranger" (also released as standalone mp3 on iTunes. Reissued on Bandcamp 18 December 2014)
 Teenage Rampage (Vive Le Rock, VIVE016, 2013, CD)
 "RNR★"
Redrock Festival 2016: All Day Rock Fest - National and International Bands 2nd Oct 2016 (Redwire, RED002, 2016 CD)
 "Bad Girl"
The Punk Lounge Presents.. Songs From The Sofa Volume 1 (The Punk Lounge, download on Bandcamp, 2018)
"You"

Other projects by Danie Cox/Centric

The Lurkers
See also The Lurkers discography
High Velocity EP (Human Punk/Damaged Goods, DAMGOOD491-HP002, 2017, limited edition 500 copies on 7 inch pink vinyl)
 "High Velocity" (single A side - two non-Centric tracks on B side)
Electrical Guitar  (Human Punk/Damaged Goods, 2019, limited edition 750 copies on 7 inch split black/clear vinyl) - UK Vinyl Singles chart no.1
 Electrical Guitar
 That Was Julia
Sex Crazy (studio album, two Centric tracks) Damaged Goods DAMGOOD541 2020
High Velocity
Electrical Guitar
 (Track 10 This is Your Revolution had also previously been recorded with Centric and performed live by The Featherz. The Lurkers recorded earlier versions of several other tracks with Centric early in the album sessions.)

Slady
Merry Xmas Everybody (Sladydor, 5624, 2022, CD single and Download)
"Merry Xmas Everybody"
 "Slade Are For Life, (Not Just For Christmas)" (by John Barker/Slady)

Videography

Music videos
The Featherz

Other projects by Danie Cox/Centric:

Appearances by Danie Cox/Centric in other acts' official videos

In addition, in 2015 Cox starred in and Monroe directed an unofficial video for "Never Marry A Railroadman" by Shocking Blue.

Concert tours

Headlining 
 November 2017 UK tour - four dates including London 100 Club support slot for The Members

Opening act 
 Boy George's This Is What I Do UK tour, first leg - all seven dates (November 2013) 
 The Damned's December 2015 UK tour - three dates plus afterparty for London date and headline show in Camden one night before opening date
 Healthy Junkies' Box of Chaos UK tour - four dates plus headline show in Southend two nights before opening date (June–July 2016)
In addition, as sidewomen in the Poussez Posse, the founding line-up of Cox, Smith and Spiers-MacLeod toured supporting Adam Ant's The Good the Mad and the Lovely UK tour - three dates including preview show (May 2011) Side project Slady toured with The Rezillos on their Summer 2022 national tour - three dates plus headline show in Brighton, day after final date (June 2022)

Equipment 
Prior to 2021, Cox/Centric's signature instrument was her emerald-glitter painted Stratocaster "Alian". In the aftermath of Kemp's death, she received a cherry red Gibson SG as a birthday present from her Slady bandmates, named "Dave" in his memory which has become her main guitar. Since early 2015 she has also had a light blue Fender acoustic guitar, named "Glas" (Welsh for "sky"/"blue") which has been used with both Slady and The Featherz-related acoustic performances (replacing an earlier black acoustic guitar, a gift from Smith).

When Spiers-Macleod joined the Poussez Posse in 2011, Cox loaned her a bass "Gravy" which she continued to use until leaving The Featherz in 2014.  Atkinson had her own bass "Dallon" - a white Gibson Thunderbird which she continued to use with subsequent bands the Black Bullets and Neverlanded - and a blue Dean Exotica acoustic bass named "Lola" (to visually match "Glas" at acoustic gigs).

References

External links
 The Featherz official website
 The Featherz discography on Discogs.com

English indie rock groups
English punk rock groups
Glam punk groups
2011 establishments in England
Musical groups established in 2011